"Special Delivery" is a science fiction short story by  American writer Damon Knight. It first appeared in the April 1954 issue of Galaxy Science Fiction and has been reprinted a number of times, in Operation Future (1955), Far Out (1961), and The Best of Damon Knight (1976).

Synopsis 
Len and Moira Connington are expecting a baby; Len teaches high-school chemistry and hopes for a promotion.  Moira begins to act strangely; it seems as if someone else, a child, is sometimes speaking through her mouth, and she develops aversions to alcohol and coffee. Eventually they realize that the unborn baby, Leo (who named himself for Leonardo da Vinci), is communicating with and through the mother.  Leo's intellect develops quickly; soon he is demanding that Moira read German so that he can learn it. At a soiree with the school superintendent, Leo objects to Moira drinking tea, and causes her to spill it on the superintendent's wife's lap. Len's teaching contract is not renewed.

By his eighth month, Leo is requiring Moira to work her way through texts on biology, astrophysics, modern literature, etc. He decides he wants to write a novel; he dictates the first chapter - an historical novel, which Moira titles "The Virgin of Persepolis" - and Moira sends it to a publisher under a pen name.  After two weeks the publisher sends a book contract and an advance for nine hundred dollars.  Leo continues dictating, until several chapters are completed. Then he loses interest. Len asks the reason. Moira says

Moira attempts to complete the novel on her own. She goes into labor. Leo realizes what is happening and objects, but in vain. He is born as a normal baby.

Background
About this story, Knight wrote 
My sympathy in this story is divided, but goes mainly to the child - I'm sorry that the plot required him to be choked off.

References

External links

1954 short stories
Science fiction short stories
Works originally published in Galaxy Science Fiction
Short stories by Damon Knight